The Anointed One is a fictional character in the television series Buffy the Vampire Slayer. The character is played by Andrew J. Ferchland. His epithet could refer to his position as the "messiah" (another word meaning anointed) of the vampire the Master.

Character history
Introduced in season one to help The Master escape his confinement, he is killed by Spike in the season two episode "School Hard".

A prophecy foretold the coming of the Anointed One:
"And there will be a time of crisis, of worlds hanging in the balance. And in this time shall come the Anointed, the Master's great warrior... The Five will die, and from their ashes the Anointed shall rise. The Brethren of Aurelius shall meet him and usher him to his immortal destiny. ...the Slayer will not know him, will not stop him, and he will lead her into Hell."

In the episode "Never Kill a Boy on the First Date" a bus passing through Sunnydale was attacked by a group of the Master's vampires. The driver and four passengers were killed, and two of them were made vampires. One of these, a little boy named Collin, became the Anointed, a bloodthirsty companion to the Master. (Buffy killed the other new vampire, psychotic Andrew Borba, and mistakenly assumed that he was the Anointed One.)

As foretold by Aurelius, the Anointed One later led Buffy to the lair of the Master. Though it wasn't the literal Hell, Buffy would be defeated and killed by the Master. Buffy states that she recognized the Anointed One for what he was as Giles and Ms. Calendar realized he was a child, defying the prophecy (although it is possible the prophecy referred to Buffy mistaking Borba for the Anointed One).

Following the Master's demise at Buffy's hands, the Anointed One rallied the remaining members of the Order of Aurelius under his command, employing the vampire Absalom as his leading acolyte. The Anointed One and his lackeys attempted to resurrect the Master via a magic ritual, but were foiled when Buffy destroyed the Master's bones with a sledgehammer. Weeks later, he was killed by a newcomer to Sunnydale, Spike. Spike placed him in a cage and hoisted it into the sunlight, incinerating the Anointed One as he declared, "From now on, we're gonna have a little less ritual, and a little more fun around here!"

Joss Whedon said that early on the plan was to use the Anointed One as the principal Big Bad for Season Two. However, these plans were changed because actor Andrew J. Ferchland was still growing and would not be believable as a perpetual child for very long.

See also
List of Buffyverse villains and supernatural beings

References

Buffy the Vampire Slayer characters
Buffyverse vampires
Child characters in television
Television characters introduced in 1997
Male characters in television

fr:Personnages de Buffy contre les vampires et d'Angel#Le Juste des Justes